Foreign relations exist between Australia and Greece. Relations between the two states are close: the countries were allies during both World Wars and the Korean War. During World War II, Australian forces took part in the Battle of Greece and the Battle of Crete. There is a large Greek community in Australia (dating from the 1950s and 1960s). Each country has an embassy in the other's capital. Greece also has consulates general in Sydney, Melbourne and Adelaide, as well as a consulate in Perth, honorary consulates general in Brisbane and Darwin, and honorary consulates in Newcastle and Hobart. Both countries are full members of the Organisation for Economic Co-operation and Development.

Australia and Greece have a close bilateral relationship based on historical ties and the rich contribution of Greek Australians to Australian society. In 2019, the export of Australian services to Greece was valued at $92 million, while services imports from Greece totalled $750 million. Australia's stock of investment in Greece in 2019 totalled $481 million. Investment in Australia from Greece was $192 million.

List of bilateral visits
The following state visits have occurred:
 March 1955, Prime Minister of Australia Robert Menzies visited Greece
 June 2002, President of Greece Konstantinos Stephanopoulos visited Australia
 July 2002, Prime Minister of Australia John Howard visited Athens
 April 2005, Prime Minister of Australia John Howard visited Greece
 May 2007, Greek Prime Minister, Kostas Karamanlis and Greek Foreign Minister Dora Bakoyannis and a delegation of Greek officials and media visited Australia

List of bilateral treaties and agreements
23 Australia–Greece bilateral treaties covering extradition, taxation, trade, War and its aftermath, social security and other matters have been agreed between the two countries.

2 agreements are pending:
 bilateral Social Security Agreement
 Greek–Australian bilateral Agreement on Holidays with Employment Rights

Economic and trade relations

Bilateral economic relations between both countries are at a very low level and there are significant fluctuations in the volume of trade. According to data by the National Statistical Service of Greece, the total volume of trade between the two countries rose by 34.05% reaching 143.228 million Euros.

See also
Foreign relations of Australia
Foreign relations of Greece
Greek Australian
Australians in Greece
List of ambassadors of Greece to Australia
Greek community of Melbourne

Notes

External links
 Australian Department of Foreign Affairs and Trade about the relation with Greece
 Australian embassy in Athens
Greek Ministry of Foreign Affairs about the relation with Australia
Greek embassy in Canberra
Greek general consulate in Sydney
Greek general consulate in Adelaide
Greek general consulate in Melbourne
Greek consulate in Perth
Hellenic Australian Business Council

 
Greece
Australia